Cardepia affinis is a species of moth of the family Noctuidae. It is found in south-western Europe, North Africa, Israel, Lebanon, Syria, Jordan and the Sinai in Egypt, the Arabian Peninsula and southern Iran.

Adults are on wing from November to January and from March to May. There are two generations per year.

The larvae feed on various halophilous plants, including Atriplex species.

Subspecies
Cardepia affinis affinis
Cardepia affinis antinea (Morocco to the Canary Islands)
Cardepia affinis europaea
Cardepia affinis iatnana

External links
 Hadeninae of Israel

Hadenini
Moths of Africa
Moths of Europe
Moths of Asia
Moths described in 1913